Thomas Denny may refer to:
T. A. Denny (1818–1909), Irish businessman
Thomas Denny (artist) (born 1956), British painter and stained glass artist